Timothy Condon (12 May 1876 – 22 May 1918) was an Irish sportsperson. He played hurling with his local clubs Horse and Jockey and Tubberadora and was a member of the Tipperary senior hurling team between 1896 and 1907.

Biography

Raised in Ballinure, County Tipperary, Condon was born to Michael Condon, a slater, and his wife Johanna. After a brief education he later worked as a plasterer in his local area.

Condon first came to prominence as a hurler with the Tubberadora club with whom he won a Tipperary Championship medal in 1898. He later won a second championship medal as captain of the Horse and Jockey in 1898.

After impressing at club level, Condon joined the Tipperary senior hurling team during the 1896 championship. Over the following four seasons he won All-Ireland Championship medals in 1896, 1898 and as captain in 1899 after respective defeats of Dublin, Kilkenny and Wexford. Condon also won three Munster Championship medals. He continued to play for Tipperary at various times until 1907.

Condon died from tuberculosis on 22 May 1918.

Honours

Tubberadora
Tipperary Senior Hurling Championship (1): 1898

Horse and Jockey
Tipperary Senior Hurling Championship (1): 1899 (c)

Tipperary
All-Ireland Senior Hurling Championship (3): 1896, 1898, 1899 (c)
Munster Senior Hurling Championship (3): 1896, 1898, 1899 (c)

References

1876 births
1918 deaths
Tubberadora hurlers
Tipperary inter-county hurlers
All-Ireland Senior Hurling Championship winners
20th-century deaths from tuberculosis
Tuberculosis deaths in Ireland
Disease-related deaths in the Republic of Ireland